The British Monarchists Society is a non-partisan monarchist organization started by Thomas Mace-Archer-Mills in 2012 as a private limited company under guarantee. This organization was created supporting the monarchy of the United Kingdom.

Among its patrons are Lord Rana, Lord Selkirk of Douglas, politicians Pauline Latham and Marco Longhi, composer Olga Thomas and actor Rupert Everett.

References

External links 
 Website

Monarchist organizations
Private companies limited by guarantee of the United Kingdom
2012 establishments in the United Kingdom
Organizations established in 2012
Monarchism in the United Kingdom